Eupterote asclepiades is a moth in the family Eupterotidae. It was described by Swinhoe in 1894. It is found in Sundaland. The habitat consist of lowland rainforests, including hill dipterocarp forests.

The larvae are polyphagous.

References

Moths described in 1894
Eupterotinae
Moths of Asia